The 2nd constituency of the Alpes Maritimes is a French legislative constituency in the Alpes Maritimes département. Like the other 576 French constituencies, it elects one MP using the two-round system, with a run-off if no candidate receives over 50% of the vote in the first round.

Geography 
It covers the centre-west of the city of Nice, and had 99,035 inhabitants at the last count.

Historic Representation

Election results

2022

 
 
 
 
 
 
 
 
 
|-
| colspan="8" bgcolor="#E9E9E9"|
|-

2017

2012

|- style="background-color:#E9E9E9;text-align:center;"
! colspan="2" rowspan="2" style="text-align:left;" | Candidate
! rowspan="2" colspan="2" style="text-align:left;" | Party
! colspan="2" | 1st round
! colspan="2" | 2nd round
|- style="background-color:#E9E9E9;text-align:center;"
! width="75" | Votes
! width="30" | %
! width="75" | Votes
! width="30" | %
|-
| style="background-color:" |
| style="text-align:left;" | Charles Ange Ginesy
| style="text-align:left;" | Union for a Popular Movement
| UMP
| 
| 35.78%
| 
| 53.29%
|-
| style="background-color:" |
| style="text-align:left;" | André Aschieri
| style="text-align:left;" | Europe Ecology – The Greens
| EELV
| 
| 28.72%
| 
| 46.71%
|-
| style="background-color:" |
| style="text-align:left;" | Jean-Marc Degioanni
| style="text-align:left;" | National Front
| FN
| 
| 21.06%
| colspan="2" style="text-align:left;" |
|-
| style="background-color:" |
| style="text-align:left;" | Fabrice Lachenmaier
| style="text-align:left;" | Regionalist
| REG
| 
| 7.04%
| colspan="2" style="text-align:left;" | 
|-
| style="background-color:" |
| style="text-align:left;" | Frédérique Cattaert
| style="text-align:left;" | Left Front
| FG
| 
| 4.11%
| colspan="2" style="text-align:left;" | 
|-
| style="background-color:" |
| style="text-align:left;" | Patrice Miran
| style="text-align:left;" | Other ecologists
| ECO
| 
| 1.36%
| colspan="2" style="text-align:left;" | 
|-
| style="background-color:" |
| style="text-align:left;" | Brigitte Reynard
| style="text-align:left;" | Other ecologists
| ECO
| 
| 1.25%
| colspan="2" style="text-align:left;" | 
|-
| style="background-color:" |
| style="text-align:left;" | Michelle Paulus
| style="text-align:left;" | Far Left
| EXG
| 
| 0.38%
| colspan="2" style="text-align:left;" | 
|-
| style="background-color:" |
| style="text-align:left;" | Alain Bouilleaux
| style="text-align:left;" | Far Left
| EXG
| 
| 0.30%
| colspan="2" style="text-align:left;" | 
|-
| colspan="8" style="background-color:#E9E9E9;"|
|- style="font-weight:bold"
| colspan="4" style="text-align:left;" | Total
| 
| 100%
| 
| 100%
|-
| colspan="8" style="background-color:#E9E9E9;"|
|-
| colspan="4" style="text-align:left;" | Registered voters
| 
| style="background-color:#E9E9E9;"|
| 
| style="background-color:#E9E9E9;"|
|-
| colspan="4" style="text-align:left;" | Blank/Void ballots
| 
| 0.69%
| 
| 1.71%
|-
| colspan="4" style="text-align:left;" | Turnout
| 
| 59.01%
| 
| 55.96%
|-
| colspan="4" style="text-align:left;" | Abstentions
| 
| 40.99%
| 
| 44.04%
|-
| colspan="8" style="background-color:#E9E9E9;"|
|- style="font-weight:bold"
| colspan="6" style="text-align:left;" | Result
| colspan="2" style="background-color:" | UMP hold
|}

2007

2002

 
 
 
 
 
 
|-
| colspan="8" bgcolor="#E9E9E9"|
|-

1997

 
 
 
 
 
 
 
|-
| colspan="8" bgcolor="#E9E9E9"|
|-

Sources

 Official results of French elections from 1998: 

2